Liatris scariosa, called savanna blazing star, is a species of flowering plant in the genus Liatris, native to the US states of Maryland, North Carolina, Pennsylvania, Tennessee, Virginia and West Virginia. It is fire-adapted, and its seeds germinate if they detect chemicals from plant smoke. It is a perennial herb that grows in dry woods and clearings. The Latin specific epithet scariosa means shriveled.

References

scariosa
Endemic flora of the United States
Plants described in 1803
Flora without expected TNC conservation status